Helminthotheca (commonly called ox-tongue) is a genus in the tribe Cichorieae of the family Asteraceae.  Helminthotheca is closely related to the genus Picris, both within the Hypochaeridinae subtribe.

 Species
 Helminthotheca aculeata - Italy, Algeria, Tunisia
 Helminthotheca balansae - Algeria, Morocco
 Helminthotheca comosa - Algeria, Morocco, Spain, Portugal, Gibraltar
 Helminthotheca echioides (syn. Picris echioides) - widespread across much of Europe and the Mediterranean from Ireland + Canary Islands to Poland + Iran; naturalized in Australia, North and South America
 Helminthotheca glomerata - Algeria, Tunisia, Morocco

References

Asteraceae genera
Cichorieae